The Birmingham School of Law is a state-accredited law school located in Birmingham, Alabama.  Founded in 1915 by Judge Hugh A. Locke, a judge of the Chancery Court and president of the Birmingham Bar Association, the Birmingham School of Law offers a part-time program of study in which graduates receive the Juris Doctor (J.D.) degree.

Program of Study
The school is located in downtown Birmingham. Birmingham School of Law has renovated an historical building into an educational facility. The school consists of an auditorium, mock courtroom, legal library, computer lab, and multimedia classrooms. In the past, classes were held at Birmingham-Southern College, the Birmingham YMCA, the historic Frank Nelson Building in downtown Birmingham, and the Jefferson County Courthouse.  Birmingham School of Law is a 4-year law school.

Associations
American Association for Justice
Christian Legal Society
Delta Theta Phi
National Black Law Students Association

Accreditation and Bar Exam Performance
Graduates are eligible to take the Alabama Bar Exam pursuant to the authority granted by the Alabama Legislature and the Alabama Supreme Court. At the July 2020 sitting of the Alabama bar exam, 70.6% of Birmingham School of Law's first-time takers passed, compared to 87.7% for the state as a whole.  The Birmingham School of Law is not accredited by the American Bar Association, nor is the school seeking accreditation.

Notable alumni 

Clarence W. Allgood (1902–1991), United States federal judge
James D. Martin (1918–2017), former Republican politician from Alabama
Richard Shelby (b. 1934), senior United States senator from Alabama
Mike D. Rogers (b. 1958), U.S. Representative for Alabama's 3rd congressional district since 2003
Phil Williams (b. 1965), Republican member of the Alabama State Senate, representing District 10.

References

External links
 

Universities and colleges in Birmingham, Alabama
Educational institutions established in 1915
1915 establishments in Alabama
Private universities and colleges in Alabama
Birmingham School of Law